Mecodema dux is a medium-bodied New Zealand endemic ground beetle that is found in the Ruahine Ranges, Taupo, Rangitikei and southwestern Hawke's Bay entomological regions.

Diagnosis 
Distinguished from other North Island Mecodema species by:

 the overall pronotal shape being ovate;
 numerous punctures between pronotal foveae; 
 elytral striae 1–4 with obsolescent punctures, striae 5–8 with punctures more impressed; 
 the distinctive shape of the apical portion of the penis lobe.

Description 
Length 19–24 mm, pronotal width 5–6 mm, elytral width 6–7.1 mm. Colour of entire body dark reddish-brown to matte black, coxae and legs reddish-brown.

Natural History 
A flightless and nocturnal predator of a variety of invertebrates on the forest floor.

Further research is required.

References 

dux
Beetles described in 1949